Limnogyrinus is an extinct genus of dissorophoidean euskelian temnospondyl within the family Micromelerpetontidae.

See also
 Prehistoric amphibian
 List of prehistoric amphibians

References

Dissorophoids
Prehistoric amphibian genera
Carboniferous temnospondyls of Europe
Permian temnospondyls of Europe
Fossil taxa described in 1986